Caleb Paul Ferguson (born July 2, 1996) is an American professional baseball pitcher for the Los Angeles Dodgers of Major League Baseball (MLB).

Amateur career
Ferguson attended West Jefferson High School in West Jefferson, Ohio. As a senior in 2014, he underwent Tommy John Surgery. Despite the injury, he was drafted by the Los Angeles Dodgers in the 38th round of the 2014 Major League Baseball draft. He signed with the Dodgers, forgoing his commitment to play college baseball at West Virginia University.

Professional career
Ferguson made his professional debut in 2015, with the Arizona League Dodgers and spent the whole season there, pitching to a 0–3 record and 8.59 ERA in 14.2 innings. In 2016, he played for the Arizona League Dodgers, Ogden Raptors and Great Lakes Loons, compiling a 3–4 record and 2.31 ERA in 14 games (12 starts). He pitched 2017 with the Rancho Cucamonga Quakes where he was 9–4 with a 2.87 ERA in 25 games (24 starts). Ferguson started 2018 with the Tulsa Drillers and was promoted to the Oklahoma City Dodgers during the season.

Ferguson was called up to the majors by the Dodgers to make his debut as the starting pitcher against the Pittsburgh Pirates on June 6, 2018. He hit the first batter he faced and wound up allowing four runs on three hits with three walks, three strikeouts and two hit batters in only 1 innings. He picked up his first career MLB win on June 23 against the New York Mets with four scoreless innings out of the bullpen. Ferguson recorded his first career save on July 2, 2018 against the Pittsburgh Pirates, pitching three scoreless innings to end a 17-1 blowout.

Ferguson became a key member of the Dodgers' bullpen in the second half of the season. He had one of the best ERAs of any relievers, and had the highest percentage of pitches in the strike zone of any Dodger reliever. He was 7–2 with a 3.49 ERA in 29 games (three starts). He was effective in the playoffs, allowing no hits or runs in three innings over six appearances, but was left off the World Series roster. In 2019, he pitched in 46 games for the Dodgers with a 1–2 record and 4.84 ERA, while making two starts.

In mid-September 2020, Ferguson suffered damage to his ulnar collateral ligament and underwent Tommy John surgery, for the second time in his life. He pitched in 21 games during the pandemic-shortened season, and was 2–1 with a 2.89 ERA. On February 19, 2021, Ferguson was placed on the 60-day injured list as he continued to recover from Tommy John surgery.

Ferguson rejoined the major league roster in the 2022 season, where he pitched in 37 games and allowed seven runs in  innings for a 1.82 ERA.

On January 13, 2023, Ferguson agreed to a one-year, $1.1 million contract with the Dodgers, avoiding salary arbitration.

References

External links

1996 births
Living people
Baseball players from Columbus, Ohio
Major League Baseball pitchers
Los Angeles Dodgers players
Arizona League Dodgers players
Ogden Raptors players
Great Lakes Loons players
Rancho Cucamonga Quakes players
Tulsa Drillers players
Oklahoma City Dodgers players